Antsiranana II (or: Diego II) is a district of Diana in Madagascar.

It covers the rural municipalities around the city of Antsiranana, better known as Diego Suarez, or simply called Diego.

Roads
This district is crossed by the National road 6

Municipalities
The total population of the district of Antsiranana II (Diego II) is 133027 inhabitants that live in the following 21 municipalities:
Ambolobozobe - 3412 inhabitants
Ambondrona - 4267 inhabitants
Andranofanjava - 4393 inhabitants
Andrafiabe - 4042 inhabitants
Andranovondronina - 2950 inhabitants
Ankarongana - 5763 inhabitants
Anketrakabe - 6322 inhabitants
Anivorano Nord - 24901 inhabitants
Antanamitarana - 6271 inhabitants
Antsakoabe - 2232 inhabitants
Antsalaka - 5066 inhabitants
Antsoha - 6290 inhabitants
Bobasakoa  - 3483 inhabitants
Bobakilandy - 3218 inhabitants
Joffreville - 3276 inhabitants
Mahalina - 2196 inhabitants
Mahavanona -  14235 inhabitants 
Mangaoka - 5279 inhabitants
Mosorolava - 6554 inhabitants
Sadjoavato - 5994 inhabitants
Sakaramy - 4257 inhabitants
Ramena - 3527 inhabitants
Total of 133027 inhabitants for the district of Antsiranana II (Diego II).

References 

Districts of Diana Region